Gabriel Stevenson, professionally known as Like, is an American hip hop producer, recording artist, and DJ from Los Angeles, California. The three time Grammy nominee began working with the Pacific Division, a hip hop trio, better known as Pac Div in 2006.

Like has released music as a solo artist. He released instrumental albums, Zesty and Lightwork in 2014 and Emeralds in 2016. On September 30, 2016, he released his first solo rap album, Songs Made While High, which features Anderson .Paak, Buddy, and Kali Uchis.

In 2017, Pac Div regrouped and are scheduled to release an album at the end of the year.

Discography
 LP (Long Play), EP (Extended Play), SI (Single), N/A (Not Available)
 Features group projects, solo projects, production credits and features

Instrumental/solo projects 
All Songs produced by Like

Pac Div studio albums

Pac Div mixtapes

Pac Div EP's

Guest appearances
 List of features with other performing artists, showing year released and album name

References

Hip hop discographies
Discographies of American artists